The 1981 Metro Conference men's basketball tournament was held March 6–8 at Freedom Hall in Louisville, Kentucky. 

Top-seeded Louisville defeated Cincinnati in the championship game, 42–31, to win their third Metro men's basketball tournament.

The Cardinals received an automatic bid to the 1981 NCAA Tournament, serving as the conference's lone representative.

Format
All seven of the conference's members participated in the tournament field. They were seeded based on regular season conference records, with the top team earning a bye into the semifinal round. The other six teams entered into the preliminary first round.

Bracket

References

Metro Conference men's basketball tournament
Tournament
Metro Conference men's basketball tournament
Metro Conference men's basketball tournament